Official National Lampoon Bicentennial Calendar 1976 was an American humorous calendar that was published in 1975 as a spin-off from National Lampoon magazine. It was written and compiled by Christopher Cerf and Bill Effros.
The cover art is a drawing of Mount Rushmore showing a bullet hole in the forehead of the sculpture of US President Abraham Lincoln (a reference to his assassination in 1865).

References

 Amazon listing
 Mentioned and shown on Mark's Very Large National Lampoon Site

National Lampoon (franchise)
United States Bicentennial
Published calendars